Li Yifei (born January 1964) is a Chinese politician  who is the current political commissar and party secretary of Xinjiang Production and Construction Corps, in office since 19 October 2021.

He is a representative of the 19th National Congress of the Communist Party of China.

Biography
Li was born in Mojiang County, Yunnan, in January 1964. In 1980, he enrolled in Kunming Medical University, majoring in hygiene, after graduating in 1985, he worked at the university. He also earned his Master of Public Administration degree from Tsinghua University in 2008.

He got involved in politics in June 1986, when he was appointed as an official in the Yunnan Provincial Labor and Personnel Department and then to Yunnan Provincial Economic and Trade Commission in November 1998. In November 2001, he was made deputy director of Yunnan Provincial Nonferrous Geological Bureau, and served until July 2003, when he was transferred to Dêqên Tibetan Autonomous Prefecture and appointed deputy party secretary. In December 2009, he took office as deputy party secretary of Kunming, a major city and the capital of Yunnan. In December 2012, he became deputy secretary-general of Yunnan, rising to secretary-general in February 2015. He became a member of the Standing Committee of the CPC Yunnan Provincial Committee in May 2016 before being assigned to the similar position in the neighboring Guizhou province in March 2017. He also served as head of Organization Department of CPC Guizhou Provincial Committee between April 2017 and May 2020.

In May 2020, he was assigned to northwest China's Xinjiang Uygur Autonomous Region, where he was admitted to member of the standing committee of the CPC Xinjiang Regional Committee, the region's top authority. He was head of Organization Department of CPC Xinjiang Regional Committee in June 2020, and held that office until July 2021, when he was promoted to become deputy party secretary of Xinjiang and party secretary of Education Committee. On 19 October 2021, he took up the post of political commissar and party secretary of Xinjiang Production and Construction Corps, concurrently serving as chairman of China Xinjian Group Corporation. His predecessor Wang Junzheng was appointed party secretary of Tibet.

References

1964 births
Living people
People from Mojiang Hani Autonomous County
Kunming Medical University alumni
Tsinghua University alumni
People's Republic of China politicians from Yunnan
Chinese Communist Party politicians from Yunnan